The 1959–60 international cricket season was from September 1959 to April 1960.

Season overview

November

Australia in Pakistan

December

Australia in India

January

England in the West Indies

Ceylon in India

References

International cricket competitions by season
1959 in cricket
1960 in cricket